Academy School District 20 is a school district located in El Paso County, Colorado. It is in the northern part of Colorado Springs, Colorado and the area surrounding the Air Force Academy.

List of schools

Elementary
Academy International Elementary
Antelope Trails Elementary
Chinook Trail Elementary
The da Vinci Academy
Discovery Canyon Campus School
Douglass Valley Elementary
Edith Wolford Elementary
Explorer Elementary
Foothills Elementary
Frontier Elementary
High Plains Elementary
Legacy Peak Elementary
Mountain View Elementary
Pioneer Elementary
Prairie Hills Elementary
Ranch Creek Elementary
Rockrimmon Elementary
School in the Woods
Woodmen-Roberts Elementary 
Journey k-8 ( virtual)

Middle
Aspen Valley Middle School
Challenger Middle School
Discovery Canyon Campus
Eagleview Middle School
Mountain Ridge Middle School
Timberview Middle School
Summer School and Enrichment
Home School Academy
Chinook Trail Middle School

High
 Air Academy High School
 Aspen Valley High School
 Discovery Canyon Campus
 Liberty High School
 Pine Creek High School
 Rampart High School
 Online High School

Charter
 The Classical Academy 
New Summit Charter Academy

See also
List of school districts in Colorado

References

External links

School districts in Colorado
Education in Colorado Springs, Colorado
School districts established in 1957
1957 establishments in Colorado